was a political party in Japan. It was active from 1890 to 1891.

History
Following the July 1890 elections the Taiseikai was established by a group of 79 newly elected and pro-government National Diet members who were largely former civil servants. The second-largest party after the Rikken Jiyūtō, it was a largely pragmatic group rather than adhering to certain principles.

The party split in November 1891 over its support for the government, with a group breaking away to form the Tomoe Club, and it ceased to exist by the time of the February 1892 elections.

Election results

References

Defunct political parties in Japan
Political parties established in 1890
1890 establishments in Japan
Political parties disestablished in 1891
1891 disestablishments in Japan